Marína Georgievová is a Slovak model and beauty pageant titleholder who won Miss Slovensko 2010 titles.

She represented Slovakia in Miss World 2010 at Sanya, China, on October 30, 2010.

References

Slovak beauty pageant winners
Miss World 2010 delegates
Living people
Year of birth missing (living people)
Place of birth missing (living people)
Slovak models
People from Banská Bystrica